Lin SiYi (born April 5, 1994 in Wenzhou, Zhejiang, China) is a Chinese singer and actress, and a former member of Team HII of Chinese idol girl group SNH48.

Career

SNH48
Prior to her entry into SNH48, Lin worked as a television director for Beijing TV Life Channel from August to December 2012, and as an intern editor for Board Games (Chinese: 桌游志) magazine.

On August 3, Lin took part in the audition for second-generation members of SNH48, and was one of the 34 girls who qualified, becoming one of the 31 official second-generation members on September 5. In November, she became a member of Team NII of SNH48.

In January 2014, Lin took part in the "SNH48 1st Kouhaku Uta Gassen", and was announced as acting captain  In September, she starred in a play based on the comic One Hundred Thousand Bad Jokes.

In July 2015, during SNH48's 2nd General Election, she was ranked 17th with 16050.5 votes, and was made the Under Girls center. In July 2016, during SNH48's third General Election, she came in 13th with 38786.4 votes. In July 2017, during SNH48's fourth General Election, Lin came in 14th with 45981.6 votes.

In February 2018, during SNH48's fourth Request Time, Lin was transferred to Team HII as part of the SNH48 Team Shuffle.  In July 2018, during SNH48's fifth General Election, Lin came in 10th.

Solo activities
In 2016, Lin made her acting debut in the historical comedy drama Legend of Ace. The same year, Lin was cast in the gastronomy comedy film Return Upon Shef.

Lin gained recognition after playing supporting roles in the hit xianxia drama Fighter of the Destiny, followed by the popular historical romance drama Legend of Yunxi.

In 2018, Lin took on her first lead role in the campus web drama Lost Control. The same year, she was cast in the historical romantic film The Story of Turandot directed by Zheng Xiaolong, and youth music drama So Young.

Discography

Filmography

Film

Television series

SNH48 activities

EPs

Albums
 Mae Shika Mukanee (2014)

Units

SNH48 Stage Units

Concert units

References

External links
 Official Member Profile 
 

1994 births
Living people
SNH48 members
Actresses from Zhejiang
Singers from Zhejiang
21st-century Chinese actresses
Chinese film actresses
Chinese television actresses